Trimenia wallengrenii, the Wallengren's copper or Wallengren's silver-spotted copper, is a species of butterfly in the family Lycaenidae. It is endemic to South Africa.

The wingspan is 24–35 mm for males and 29–42 mm females. Adults are on wing from November to December. There is one generation per year.

Subspecies
Trimenia wallengrenii wallengrenii — near Darling in the Western Cape
Trimenia wallengrenii gonnemoi Ball, 1994 — upper slopes of the Piketberg in the Western Cape

References

Butterflies described in 1887
Trimenia (butterfly)
Insects of South Africa
Butterflies of Africa
Taxa named by Roland Trimen
Taxonomy articles created by Polbot